Jan Výtisk (born 20 July 1981) is a Czech professional ice hockey defenceman who currently plays with HC Stadion Litoměřice in the Chance liga.

References

External links

1981 births
Living people
Czech ice hockey defencemen
HC Bílí Tygři Liberec players
HC Vítkovice players
Sportspeople from Ostrava
HC Sparta Praha players
HC Karlovy Vary players
HC Plzeň players
HC Oceláři Třinec players